Lou Holmes may refer to:

 Louis Holmes (1911–2010), ice hockey centre
 Lou Holmes (footballer) (1892–1915), Australian rules footballer